Tamás Esterházy may refer to:

Tamás Esterházy (1570–1616), son of Ferenc Esterházy
Tamás Esterházy (1625–1652), son of Dániel Esterházy